Marco Antônio Freire Gomes  (born 31 July 1957 in Pirassununga) is an Army general of the Brazilian Army, current Commander since 31 March 2022.

Military career

Military official
Gomes is son of Cavalry Colonel Francisco Valdir Gomes and Maria Enilda Freire Gomes.

From Military School of Rio de Janeiro and Fortaleza, he joined the military on 14 February 1977 at the Agulhas Negras Military Academy. He was declared officer candidate of the cavalry on 15 December 1980.

During his career, he served at Cavalry units, such as the 10th Mechanized Cavalry Squad in Bela Vista - MS and the 16th Mechanized Cavalry Regiment in Bayeux. Gomes also served at the 1st Special Forces Batallion and the Command of the Paratroopers Brigade, both in Rio de Janeiro.

He was member of the United Nations Observers Group in Central America and was instructor of the Special Instruction Section of the Agulhas Negras Military Academy. General Gomes also was the first commander of the 1st Command Action Batallion in Goiânia.

As superior official, Gomes served as Chief of the Operations Division and Intelligence Division of the Institutional Security Bureau in Brasília, Chief of the Regional Military Service of the 11th Military Region; Military Aide of Defence and Army to the Brazilian Embassy in Spain, Chief of the Doctrine Section and Assistant to the 3rd Subchief of the Army Staff and Official of the Joint Staff of the Brazilian Armed Forces.

Official general
As Official General, he served as Commander of the Special Operations Command in Goiânia, 1st Subchief of the Land Operations Command in Brasília, Commander of the 10th Military Region in Fortaleza and Executive Secretary of the Institutional Security Bureau in Brasília.

Gomes was promoted to Army General on 31 July 2018, and served as Commander of the Northeastern Military Command in Recife from 21 August 2018 to 3 September 2021.

After that, Gomes served as Command of Land Operations in Brasília, from 9 September 2021 to 30 March 2022.

References

|-

|-

1957 births
Living people
People from Pirassununga
Brazilian generals